Ballus chalybeius is a jumping spider. It is the type species of the genus Ballus.

Appearance

The prosoma is dark brown in females, with irregular lighter markings. The lightly yellow legs have dark rings in both sexes. In males, which are generally darker, the first legs are dark and thickened. The species is similar to Ballus rufipes, which is smaller and much darker.

Habits
During summer, the female builds a flat silken retreat on the underside of a leaf and guards its egg sac inside.

Habitat
It can be found mostly on the fringes of deciduous forests, on broad-leaved bushes and trees, particularly oaks, and in the grass. In Central Europe, they are widely distributed and in most areas quite common.

Distribution
Ballus chalybeius occurs in Europe, North Africa to Central Asia.

Name
The species name is derived from Ancient Greek chalyb- "steel".

References

External links

Photography of Ballus chalybeius
Many pictures of Ballus chalybeius

Spiders described in 1802
Salticidae
Spiders of Europe
Spiders of Asia